This article lists all ties for medals at the Olympics. A tie occurs when two or more individual or teams achieve identical results in the Olympics. In these cases, there are multiple winners awarded the same medal.

Ties for medals at the Olympics
Ties occasionally occur during the games, and since medals are complicated to produce, the Olympic organising committee makes advance arrangements for extra medals to be produced in the event of a tie.

Number of ties for medals in Olympics history 
'Total' shows the number of ties for medals in Olympics history, while 'Events' shows the number of events with at least one medal tie. There can be more than one tie for medals for one event as there can be ties for gold, silver, and bronze.

List of ties at the Summer Olympics 

 1896
 1900
 1904
 1908
 1912
 1920
 1924
 1928
 1936
 1948
 1952
 1956
 1960
 1964
 1968
 1972
 1976
 1980
 1984
 1988
 1992
 1996
 2000
 2004
 2008
 2012
 2016
 2020

List of ties at the Winter Olympics 

 1924
 1928
 1948
 1952
 1956
 1960
 1964
 1968
 1972
 1980
 1992
 1998
 2002
 2010
 2014
 2018

Ties not included in this list 

This list does not include events where two bronze medals are awarded due to repechage or the non-existence of a bronze-medal playoff as they are awarded due to the rules of the sports, thus not considered as ties. All events that are not listed, namely those below, awarded two bronze medals.

In addition, two finals were held for one rowing event at the 1900 Olympics, men's coxed four. This was due to a controversy about which boats should advance to the final; thus two separate finals were held, awarding two sets of medals for the same event, both which are considered Olympic championships by the International Olympic Committee.

Similarly, two finals were held for some sailing events at the 1900 Olympics, namely 0 to .5 ton, .5 to 1 ton, 1 to 2 ton, 2 to 3 ton and 3 to 10 ton.

See also 
 All-time Olympic Games medal table

Notes

References

External links 

Sources
 International Olympic Committee medal database
 Ties for Medals at the Winter Olympics at OlympStats.com
 3-Way Medal Ties at OlympStats.com
 Olympics Statistics and History at Sports-Reference.com

Olympic Games medal tables
Lists of Olympic medalists